David Jason Horwitz (born 30 September 1994), commonly referred to as Dave, is an Australian rugby union player who plays as a Centre for Sydney rugby club Randwick. He formerly played for Irish rugby club Connacht and domestically New South Wales Country Eagles who did compete in the National Rugby Championship (NRC). His regular playing position is fly-half, however, Horwitz has played multiple positions in the past, including Centre.

Horwitz has represented Australia at schoolboy and under-20 level. Horwitz is contracted with Connacht for the 2018–19 seasons.

 Horwitz was the first, and currently only, Jew to play in the Super Rugby for an Australian club. In 2016, when speaking about being Jewish, Horwitz said: “I want to be known as a footballer on merit and I also want to be known in the Jewish community because I’m a proud Jew and I know that does coincide with the rugby because it’s almost a strange thing because there’s not a lot of Jewish sportsmen out there.”

Horwitz played for the New South Wales Waratahs, the Melbourne Rebels, of the Super Rugby, and Connacht (Pro14) in between 2014 and 2020. In Australian domestic rugby he played for Randwick in club rugby, and the New South Wales Country Eagles, in the National Rugby Championship (NRC).

Super Rugby statistics

References

1994 births
Living people
Australian rugby union players
Jewish rugby union players
Rugby union fly-halves
Australian people of South African descent
New South Wales Country Eagles players
Rugby union players from Sydney
Australian Jews
New South Wales Waratahs players
Rugby union centres
Australian expatriate rugby union players
Expatriate rugby union players in Ireland
Connacht Rugby players
Melbourne Rebels players